French football club SEC Bastia's 1977–78 season. Finished 5th place in league. Top scorer of the season, including 22 goals in 18 league matches have been Johnny Rep. Was eliminated to Coupe de France quarter-finals, the UEFA Cup was able to be among the finals.

Transfers

In 
Summer
 Félix Lacuesta from St. Etienne
 Jean-François Larios from St. Etienne
 Dominique Vésir from St. Etienne
 Johnny Rep from Valencia
 Yves Mariot from Lyon

Winter
 Pierrick Hiard from Rennes

Out 
Summer
 Dragan Džajić to Red Star Belgrade
 Jean-Louis Luccini to Auxerre
 José Pasqualetti to Olympique Ales
 Jacques Zimako to St. Etienne

Squad

Division 1

League table

Results summary

Results by round

Matches

Coupe de France 

End of 64
 7 February 1978: Bastia 3 - 1 Cannes
Bastia won 3 - 1 on aggregate.

End of 32
 25 February 1978 (1. match): Strasbourg 0 - 3 Bastia
 7 March 1978 (2. match): Bastia 0 - 0 Strasbourg
Bastia won 3 - 0 on aggregate.

End of 16
 18 March 1978 (1. match): Reims 0 - 1 Bastia
 22 March 1978 (2. match): Bastia 2 - 1 Reims
Bastia won 3 - 1 on aggregate.

Quarter-final
 15 April 1978 (1. match): Bastia 2 - 1 AS Monaco
 18 April 1978 (2. match): AS Monaco 2 - 0 Bastia
AS Monaco won 3 - 2 on aggregate.

UEFA Cup

First round 

Bastia won 5–3 on aggregate.

Second round 

Bastia won 5–2 on aggregate.

Third round 

Bastia won 5–3 on aggregate.

Quarter final 

Bastia won 9–6 on aggregate.

Semi final 

Bastia won 3–3 on away goals.

Final 

PSV Eindhoven wins 3–0 on aggregate

External links 
 Corse Football SEC Bastia 1977-78 season 
 Corse Football SEC Bastia 1977-78 UEFA Cup season 

SC Bastia seasons
Bastia